Vincent Bevins is an American journalist and writer. From 2011 to 2016, he worked as a foreign correspondent based in Brazil for the Los Angeles Times, after working previously in London for the Financial Times. In 2017 he moved to Jakarta and began covering Southeast Asia for The Washington Post, and in 2018 began writing a book about Cold War violence in Indonesia and Latin America. His work has mostly focused on international politics, the world economy, and global culture.

Career 
Bevins was born and raised in California and attended Servite High School and the University of California, Berkeley. While at UC, Berkeley, Bevins was a successful Collegiate water polo player, competing in the 2002 NCAA Men's Water Polo Championship with the California Golden Bears team that finished in the Final, losing to Stanford 7–6.

Bevins worked in Berlin before covering Hugo Chávez in Venezuela with The Daily Journal. He earned a master's degree in international political economy from the London School of Economics.

In 2012, after an investigation Bevins published on modern-day slavery in the Amazon rainforest, pig iron companies in the state of Maranhão agreed not to source their charcoal produced using slave labor, forest destruction, or invasions into indigenous lands.

In 2016, President Dilma Rousseff declared in an interview with Bevins she did not believe that the US or CIA was behind her impeachment. Suspicion of US backing was common at the time among her left-wing supporters, who like Rousseff considered the impeachment a "coup."

From 2012 to 2016, Bevins ran the "From Brazil" section of the online version of Folha de S.Paulo, Brazil's largest general newspaper, which published news and analysis from Bevins and other major correspondents in Brazil. He and this group of journalists were at the center of reporting the wave of protests beginning in June 2013 continuing until the 2014 World Cup.

Bevins sometimes writes for and appears in Brazilian media, speaking fluent Portuguese, and has also worked in Spanish and German.

In his 2020 book, The Jakarta Method, Bevins used recently declassified documents, archival search, and eyewitnesses reports to argue that the victory of the United States in the Cold War within the Third World was in part based on the extermination of unarmed leftists in the countries where the US involvement had happened, both by state forces, or by right-wing paramilitaries. The book title refers to the Indonesian mass killings of 1965–66 by the Suharto regime.

Awards 
Vincent Bevins has had his journalistic work recognized by the Los Angeles Press Club, the European Union's Lorenzo Natali Media Prize, and the Overseas Press Club.

Bibliography 
The Jakarta Method: Washington's Anticommunist Crusade and the Mass Murder Program that Shaped Our World, Public Affairs, 2020.

References

External links 

 
 Recent and archived articles by Vincent Bevins
 

Living people
Alumni of the London School of Economics
American male journalists
Financial Times people
Los Angeles Times people
University of California, Berkeley alumni
Servite High School alumni
The Washington Post people
1984 births